Kober kayaran, is a village in the Lori Province of Armenia. It belongs to the municipality of Tumanyan. At the top of the tiny hillside village is Kobayr Monastery

References 

Populated places in Lori Province